The 1973–74 snooker season was a series of snooker tournaments played between July 1973 and May 1974. The following table outlines the results for the season's events.


Calendar

Notes

References

1973
Season 1973
Season 1974